Bjarne Berntsen (born 21 December 1956) is a Norwegian football coach and former player. He is the elder brother of fellow football coach Alf Ingve Berntsen.

Playing career
Bjarne Berntsen began his football career at local club Figgjo IL. He signed for Norwegian top division club Viking in 1977, and stayed there until 1982. During this period he played 33 matches for the Norway national football team,
including the famous September 1981 win over England where he played at the right back position.

Early manager years
After retiring as a player, Berntsen coached Figgjo, Bryne and Viking. Between 1986 and 1987, Berntsen was also the assistant coach of the Norwegian national team. He won the Norwegian cup with Bryne in 1987, still only 30 years old.

Viking club director
Between 1999 and 2004, Berntsen was the Director of Viking. After Viking manager Kjell Inge Olsen resigned on 13 April 2004, he took over as caretaker manager until 12 July 2004, when the club signed Roy Hodgson as their new manager. Berntsen then resumed his role as club Director. In late 2004 he was surprisingly offered the job as head coach of the Norway women's national football team from 1 January 2005 on, which he accepted.

Women's national team coaching career
Berntsen's first tournament with the national women's team was the 2005 UEFA Women's Championship which took place in June 2005 in England. He courted controversy by including 16 year old Isabell Herlovsen, the daughter of one of his former teammates on the Norway national team, in the squad. However, she scored two vital goals to keep Norway in the tournament. After mixed fortunes in the group stage, Norway played a memorable semifinal against Sweden which they won by 3–2 after extra time with a goal from Solveig Gulbrandsen. In the final against Germany, Norway lost 3–1.

Berntsen led the national women's team through qualification to the FIFA Women's World Cup 2007 tournament in China, where they won their group by beating Canada and Ghana and drawing against Australia.  In the quarter final against the hosts China, in front of  50,000 spectators, Norway won 1–0, the only goal being scored by Herlovsen.  In the semifinal, the team lost to Germany by 3–0, and they then lost the third-place playoff 4–1 against the US to finish in fourth place.  By virtue of their performance at the World Cup, Norway qualified for the 2008 Olympics.

After the UEFA Women's Euro 2009, Berntsen resigned as coach of the women's national team.

Later years
On 11 February 2010, Viking announced that Berntsen was again hired as the Director of the club, nearly five and a half years after he resigned from the same position. Two years later, Berntsen was nominated and elected vice president of the Football Association of Norway which meant that he had to quit his position at Viking.

After Viking's relegation from the Eliteserien and manager Ian Burchnall's dismissal from the club in December 2017, Berntsen made a surprising return to Viking, leaving his role as vice president of the Norwegian FA to take on the manager role at the club. He led Viking to a first place in the 2018 1. divisjon and were promoted back to Eliteserien after one season's absence. On 20 June 2019, Viking announced that Berntsen's contract had been extended with two more years, till the end of the 2021 season.

In the Norwegian local elections, 2019 he was elected to a seat in Sandnes municipal council, representing the Labour Party.

On 26 November 2020, it was announced that Berntsen would be relieved of his duties as manager of Viking FK after the 2020 season. This was controversial as Berntsen himself was not contacted before the decision was made, and was well loved by the majority of fans. The leadership of Viking received a lot of criticism for their actions, and publicly apologised afterwards.  In June 2021 he was hired as managing director of Bryne FK. He resigned in August 2021, amid rumours that he would take over the vacant manager job at Sandnes Ulf.

Managerial statistics

References

1956 births
Living people
People from Sandnes
Norwegian footballers
Norway under-21 international footballers
Norway international footballers
Viking FK players
Norwegian football managers
Bryne FK managers
Viking FK managers
Eliteserien managers
Norway women's national football team managers
2007 FIFA Women's World Cup managers

Association football defenders
Labour Party (Norway) politicians
Rogaland politicians
Sandnes Ulf managers